Anita Mae Joan Hagen (May 6, 1931 – June 5, 2015) was a Canadian politician, who served as a New Democratic Member of the Legislative Assembly of British Columbia from 1986 to 1996, representing the riding of New Westminster. She took on the high-profile posts of Deputy Premier of British Columbia and Minister of Education when the NDP formed government in 1991, but stepped down from cabinet in 1993. She retired from active politics in 1996 at the age of 65.

In 2005, she was part of the successful Know STV campaign in British Columbia. Hagen died of cancer at Vancouver General Hospital in June 2015, leaving behind her devoted husband John Hagen and two sons.

References

1931 births
2015 deaths
British Columbia New Democratic Party MLAs
Canadian Unitarian Universalists
Women government ministers of Canada
Deaths from cancer in British Columbia
Deputy premiers of British Columbia
Education ministers of British Columbia
Members of the Executive Council of British Columbia
People from Sydney, Nova Scotia
Women MLAs in British Columbia
20th-century Canadian politicians
20th-century Canadian women politicians